"The Second Happiest Day" is an American television play broadcast on June 25, 1959 as part of the CBS television series, Playhouse 90.

Plot
Gus Taylor, the editor of a fashion magazine rehearses his wedding to Lila Norris. Gus learns that his best friend George has shot himself and leaves the rehearsal. He recalls his college days with George after serving in the Korean War. By the time Gus arrives, George has died. He returns to his wedding ceremony.

Cast
The cast included the following:

Tony Randall as Gus Taylor
Margaret O'Brien as Lila Norris
Fay Wray as Tula Marsh
Jack Mullaney as Charles "Cuppy" Vale
Judith Anderson as Ava Norris
John Lupton as George Marsh III

Bob Cummings hosted the broadcast.

Production
The program was broadcast on June 25, 1959 as the final episode in the third season of the CBS television series, Playhouse 90. Peter Kortner was the producer and Ralph Nelson the director. Steven Gethers wrote the teleplay based on the novel by John Phillips.

References

1959 American television episodes
Playhouse 90 (season 3) episodes
1959 television plays